Sun Valley is a suburb of Gladstone in the Gladstone Region, Queensland, Australia. In the  Sun Valley had a population of 1,296 people.

History 
The name of the suburb was chosen by the property developer in the early 1960s.

In the  Sun Valley had a population of 1,270 people.

The  revealed that the population of Sun Valley was 1,296 people.

References 

Suburbs of Gladstone